Val-de-Reuil is a commune in the Eure department in Normandy in north-western France. It is located south of Rouen in a loop of the Seine. Created as the new town of Le Vaudreuil in 1972, its name was changed to Val-de-Reuil in 1984 to avoid confusion with its neighbour, Le Vaudreuil.

International relations
Val-de-Reuil is twinned with Workington in the United Kingdom.

Population

The inhabitants of Val-de-Reuil are called Rolivalois.

History
Le Vaudreuil (ensemble urbain) was one of the nine new towns created in France in the beginning of the 1970s.

June 1972: creation of the Établissement public d'aménagement of the new town of Le Vaudreuil.
December 1972: creation of the urban community (ensemble urbain) of Le Vaudreuil on the territory of several existing communes including Le Vaudreuil. 
28 September 1981: the urban community became a commune, created from parts of the communes Incarville, Léry, Porte-Joie, Poses, Saint-Étienne-du-Vauvray, Saint-Pierre-du-Vauvray, Tournedos-sur-Seine and Le Vaudreuil. The new commune was named Le Vaudreuil-Ex Ensemble Urbain.
19 November 1984: the commune changed its name to Val-de-Reuil to avoid confusion with nearby Le Vaudreuil.
December, 1985: the dissolution of the établissement public d'aménagement, whose competences were transferred into the commune.
1996: Val-de-Reuil joined a communauté de communes with Louviers and Incarville.
2001: Val-de-Reuil became part of the Communauté d'agglomération Seine-Eure which has its principal centre in Louviers.

Administration
Val-de-Reuil is the seat of a canton, which includes eight communes and has a total population of 20,555 (1999).

See also
Communes of the Eure department

References

External links

 Town website

Communes of Eure
New towns in France